Karur is a city in the Indian state of Tamil Nadu. Karur is the administrative headquarters of Karur district. It is located on the banks of River Amaravathi, Kaveri and Noyyal.
Karur is well known for the export of Home Textile products to USA, UK, Australia, Europe and many more countries. It is situated at about 395 kilometers southwest of the state capital Chennai, 75 km from Tiruchirappalli, 120 km away from Coimbatore, 295 km away from Bengaluru and 300 km away from Kochi.

Etymology
Karur is mentioned in inscriptions and literature by two names, Karuvoor (the home of Karuvoor Devar) and Vanji. Additionally, it has been referred to as: Adipuram, Tiruaanilai, Paupatheechuram, Karuvaippatinam, Vanjularanyam, Garbhapuram, Thiru vithuvakkottam, Bhaskarapuram, Mudivazhangu Viracholapuram, Karapuram, Aadaga maadam, Cherama nagar and Shanmangala Kshetram. Among them, the name Adipuram, meaning the first city seems to indicate that it was held as the foremost city by the medieval writers. It was also called Vanchi moothur, the ancient city of Vanji. In the foreign notices of Ptolemy, it was called Karoura – an inland capital of the Cheras.

History

Karur has been ruled at different times by the Murkala Cheras (before the sangam period) before the kodungalur Cheras, Later Cholas, Vijayanagar Empire, Madurai Nayaks, Mysore Kingdom and the British.

Karur is one of the oldest towns in Tamil Nadu and has played a very significant role in the history and culture of the Tamils. The history dates back to the Sangam period when it was a flourishing trade centre. Karur was built on the banks of river Amaravathi which was called Aanporunai during the Sangam days. According to Hinduism, Brahma began the work of creation here, which is referred to as the "place of the sacred cow.". Karuvur, identified with Karur, was also the capital of the ancient king Musuguntha Solan.

Epigraphical, archaeological and literary evidence indicate that Karur was the capital of early Chera kings of Sangam age. The names of early Chera kings who ruled from Karur have been found in the rock inscriptions in Aaru Nattar Malai close to Karur. The Tamil epic Silapathikaram mentions that the famous Chera King Senguttuvan ruled from Karur. The archaeological excavations undertaken in Karur resulted in the excavation of mat-designed pottery, bricks, mud-toys, Roman coins, Chera coins, Pallava coins, Roman Amphorae, Rasset coated ware and rare rings. Karur might have been the center for old jewellery-making and gem setting (with the gold imported mainly from Rome), as seen from various excavations. In 150 CE, Greek scholar Ptolemy mentioned "Korevora" (Karur) as a very famous inland trading center in South India. It was ruled by the Cheras, Western Gangas, Cholas, the Vijayanagara Nayaks, Tipu Sultan and the British successively.

Karur municipality was constituted in 1874. It was upgraded to a I grade municipality on 24.10.69, upgraded to selection grade municipality on 24.05.1988, and upgraded to a special grade municipality on 07.04.1988. The town is very expanded now, with 48 wards, much like a city corporation.

Geography 

Topography  
Karur is located on the banks of the Amaravathi River and noyyal river. The topography is almost plain, with no major geological formation.

Geology  
There are no notable mineral resources available in and around the town. The soil types are black and red that are conducive for common crops in the Cauvery delta.

Climate
The prevailing climate in Karur is known as a hot semi-arid climate, labelled BSh under the Köppen and Geiger classification system. The South West monsoon, with an onset in June and lasting up to August, brings scant rainfall since Karur is in a rainshadow region. The bulk of the rainfall comes during summer months (late April, May) and the North East monsoon in the months of October, November and December. The driest month is March, with only  of rain. The precipitation varies  between the driest month and the wettest month.

Like the rest of the state, April to June are the hottest months and December to January are the coolest.

Flora and Fauna

Demographics

Karur urban area is the 15th Populous city in the state of Tamil Nadu. Karur City Area divided into Three Regions Karur, Inam karur and Thanthoni Region which is further divided into 12 divisions.  Currently Karur City has population about 434,506, with a sex-ratio of 1,032 females for every 1,000 males, much above the national average of 929. A total of 6,147 were under the age of six, constituting 3,162 males and 2,985 females. Scheduled Castes and Scheduled Tribes accounted for 12.11% and .08% of the population respectively. The average literacy of the city was 81.71%, compared to the national average of 72.99%. The city had a total of 49344 households. There were a total of 30,216 workers, comprising 125 cultivators, 181 main agricultural labourers, 469 in household industries, 26,660 other workers, 2,781 marginal workers, 24 marginal cultivators, 82 marginal agricultural labourers, 140 marginal workers in household industries and 2,535 other marginal workers. As of 2001, 13 slums were identified in the town. As per the religious census of 2011, Karur (M) had 91.41% Hindus, 5.62% Muslims, 2.88% Christians, 0.01% Sikhs, 0.01% Buddhists, 0.07% following other religions and 0.01% following no religion or did not indicate any religious preference. 

More than 8% of the total population of the Karur district and 25% of the total urban population in the district resides in the town. The town has a large floating population. Out of the total area, 86.85% of the land is marked developed and 37.63% of the city remains undeveloped. Residential areas make up 39.41% of the town's total area while commercial enterprises and industrial units make up 4.72% and 1.99% respectively.

The population density of the city in the 2001 census was 128 persons per hectare and the average household size was 3.95 as of 2001. Hindus form the majority of the urban population, followed by Muslims and Christians. Tamil is the main language spoken in the city, but the use of English is relatively common; English is the medium of instruction in most educational institutions and offices in the service sector.

Government and politics

Karur is the headquarters of the Karur District. The town was constituted as a municipality in 1874, promoted to first-grade during 1969, selected-grade during 1983 and special-grade as of 1988. The Karur municipality has 48 wards and there is an elected councillor for each of those wards. The functions of the municipality are devolved into six departments: general administration/personnel, Engineering, Revenue, Public Health, city planning and Information Technology (IT). All these departments are under the control of a Municipal Commissioner who is the executive head. The legislative powers are vested in a body of 48 members, one each from the 60 wards. The legislative body is headed by an elected Chairperson assisted by a Deputy Chairperson. On 24 August 2021, the government announced the upgrading of Karur municipality to Karur City Municipal Corporation.

Karur is a part of the Karur assembly constituency and it elects a member to the Tamil Nadu Legislative Assembly once every five years. From the 1977 elections, All India Anna Dravid Munnetra Kazhagam (AIADMK) won the assembly seat five times (in 1977, 1980, 1984, 1991, 2006 and 2011 elections) and two times by Dravida Munnetra Kazhagam (DMK, 1989 and 1996) and Indian National Congress (INC) won once during 2001 elections. The current MLA of Karur constituency is V. Senthil Balaji  from the DMK party.

Karur is a part of the Karur (Lok Sabha constituency). From 1957, the Karur parliament seat was held by the Indian National Congress for eight times (during 1957, 1962, 1967, 1971, 1977, 1980, 1984 and 2019 elections), ADMK for six times (during 1989, 1991, 1998, 1999, 2009 and 2014 elections), Tamil Maanila Congress once (during 1996 elections) and Dravid Munnetra Kazhagam once (during the 2004 elections).
 The current Member of Parliament from the constituency is S.Jothimani from Indian National Congress.

Law Enforcement

Law and order in the city in maintained by the Karur sub division of the Tamil Nadu Police headed by a Superintendent of Police. There are 4 police stations for law and order, 2 for traffic and 1 all women police station and more than 10 police outpost in the city, There are special units like prohibition enforcement, district crime, social justice and human rights, district crime records and special branch that operate at the district level police division headed by a Superintendent of Police.

Utilities 

Electricity supply to Karur is regulated and distributed by the Tamil Nadu Electricity Board (TNEB). The city along with its suburbs forms the Karur Electricity Distribution Circle. A Chief Distribution engineer is stationed at the regional headquarters. Water supply is provided by the Karur Municipality from the Cauvery river through Chinnandan Kovil head water work and Thirumanilaiyur water pumping station. In the period 2000–2001, a total of 7 million litres of water was supplied every day for households in the town.

As per the municipal data for 2011, about 45 metric tonnes of solid waste were collected from Karur every day by door-to-door collection and subsequently the source segregation and dumping was carried out by the sanitary department of the Karur municipality. The coverage of solid waste management in the town by the municipality had an efficiency of 100% as of 2001. There is no underground drainage system in the town and the sewerage system for disposal of sullage is through septic tanks, open drains and public conveniences.

As of 2011, there is one government medical college hospital, one municipal dispensary, 19 private dispensaries, one ESI dispensary, one municipal Siddha centre, two Ayurvedic clinics, three private general clinics, one private skin care clinic, nine private ENT clinics and one private tuberculosis clinic that take care of the health care needs of the citizens. As of 2011, the municipality maintained a total of 2,584 street lamps: 706 sodium lamps, 151 mercury vapour lamps, 2,274 tube lights and three high mast beam lamp. The municipality operates three markets, namely the Gandhi Market, Kamaraj Market and Uzhavar Santhai that cater to the needs of the town and the rural areas around it.

Arts, society and culture

The town formed a part of the traditional Chera and Chola empires and has a number of exquisitely sculpted temples. Karuvurar born in medieval Karur, is one among the nine devotees who sung the divine Music Thiruvichaippa, which is the ninth Thirumurai. He is the single largest composer among the nine authors of Thiruvichaippa. He lived during the reign of the Chola king Raja Raja Chola I. In addition to the Pasupatheeswarar Siva temple, there is a Vishnu temple at Thiruvithuvakkodu suburb of Karur, sung by famous Kulasekaraazhvaar (7th-8th century CE). The same temple is presumably mentioned in epic Silappadikaram as Adaha maadam Ranganathar whose blessings Cheran Senguttuvan sought before his north Indian expedition.

Economy

The city has about 19% of its total area under agricultural land use. The major crops are rice, cotton, sugar cane and oil seeds, while the major horticultural crops are coconut, banana, betel and mango. The town is the commercial centre for trading of agricultural commodities from the nearby towns and villages. Karur, being the headquarters of the district, has registered growth in tertiary sectors, with a corresponding decrease in the primary sector. Approximately 80 per cent of the workforce is employed in tertiary sector, 17 per cent in primary sector and 4% in secondary sector activities.

All major government and private banks have branches at Karur. Private banks Karur Vysya Bank and Lakshmi Vilas Bank have their headquarters in Karur.

Home Textiles

Karur is a major home textile centre and has five major product groups — bed linens, kitchen linens, toilet linens, table linens and wall hangings. The city generates around 10000 crores. More than 1.5 Billion US$ in foreign exchange through direct and indirect exports. Major importers are Wallmart, Sears in the US, IKEA in Sweden and other major retailers in the UK. Allied industries like ginning and spinning mills, dyeing factories and weaving employ around 300,000 people in and around Karur. Hand-loom Exports from Karur began on a modest scale with just 15 exporters in 1975. Karur is also home to an integrated textile park, 190 crore Karur Textile Park Limited (KTPL) a premier facility of its kind in the country for its technical and ancillary facilities.

Bus Body manufacturing
Karur is a major hub for Bus Body [coach] building in South India, with a major market share of almost 70% of bus coaches being built here locally.
The total business turnover from building bus coaches is estimated to be around 1000 crore per annum.

Mosquito nets
About 60% of mosquito nets in India are manufactured in Karur. About 2000 units are engaged in making High-density polyethylene (HDPE) mono filament yarn and associated products and employ about 50,000 people.

Newsprint

TNPL promoted by the Government of Tamil Nadu with loan assistance from the World Bank, located near Karur, is the largest producer of bagasse (sugarcane waste from Sugar mills) based paper in the world and the second-largest paper producer in Asia. The firm produces 230,000 tonnes of printing and writing paper and consumes 1 million tonnes of bagasse every year.

Others

Bharat Petroleum Corporation formed a joint venture with Petronet CCK and has installed a pipeline facility from Cochin to Karur for transporting petroleum products. The petroleum products received at the BPCL-Karur terminal in Athur is supplied to more than 20 districts of Tamil Nadu through tanker trucks.
Chettinad group has established a wet process cement plant at Puliyur near Karur with a capacity of 1.7 MTPA.

Transport

Road
The Karur corporation maintains  of roads. The city has  concrete roads,  WBM roads,  gravel roads and  bituminous road.

There are 2 national highways namely the NH 44 (new numbering) National Highway 7 (India)(old numbering) (Varanasi - Kanyakumari road (now called NSC North–south corridor road NH 44) and NH 67 Nagapattinam - Gudalur road that pass via Karur. It connects the city with all other parts of the country.

Karur bus stand is a B-grade bus stand located in the center of the town. The State Express Transport Corporation operates long-distance buses connecting the city to important cities like Chennai, Bangalore, Thiruvananthapuram, Thirupathi, Nagercoil, etc. Apart from this, Tamil Nadu State Transport Corporation operates city and moffusil busses from Karur to other parts of Tamil Nadu and neighbourhood states. Karnataka State Road Transport Corporation and Kerala State Road Transport Corporation also operates few busses to and from Karur.
Karur is situated at the centre of Tamil Nadu so you can reach any part of Tamil Nadu within seven hours.

Railway 

Karur Junction railway station (station code - KRR) is one of the railway junctions under the Salem division of the Indian Railways network. It is one of the major railway station in Southern Railways and also an A grade junction in salem division. Almost All trains to various part of the country halts here. It has 5 active Platforms and 7 broad gauge electrified tracks, that forms the intersection between Erode-Tiruchirapalli, Erode-Madurai and Salem-Karur. section.

Airport
The nearest local and international airport is the Tiruchirapalli International Airport, located 78 km, Coimbatore International Airport, located 121 km & Salem Airport, located 116 km away from the city.

Education
There are 72 government and private schools, 1 government arts college, 1 government medical college and number of private arts and science, architecture, engineering, polytechnic, Teacher training, nursing, catering colleges and large number of engineering colleges are in and around Karur.
Karur medical college has recently been established at the cost of 115 crores.

See also 
Sadasiva Brahmendra Swami Temple

Notes

References
 

 
Cities and towns in Karur district